The 1988–89 Liga Nacional de Fútbol Femenino was the inaugural edition of Spain's women's football premier league. The competition was contested by nine clubs, and took place from 4 December 1988 to 30 April 1989. Peña Barcelonista Barcilona became the first league champion with a one-point margin over runner-up Parque Alcobendas.

Teams and locations

League table and results

References

1988
Spa
1
women